Maremgi, also known as Dineor, is a Papuan language of Indonesia. It is spoken near the village of Bonggo, west of Jayapura, in a place also known as Maremgi.

Word lists

Numbers

Note - The counting system in Dineor may extend to twenty.

References

Languages of western New Guinea
Orya–Tor languages